Megalorhipida gielisi is a moth of the family Pterophoridae that is known from India (Himachal Pradesh).

References

Oxyptilini
Moths described in 2003
Endemic fauna of India
Moths of Asia